Vladimir Markelov (born August 31, 1987) is a Russian professional ice hockey forward who currently plays for Arlan Kokshetau of the Kazakhstan Hockey Championship (KAZ). He has formerly played with Barys Astana of the Kontinental Hockey League (KHL).

References

External links

1987 births
Living people
Arlan Kokshetau players
Barys Nur-Sultan players
HK Gomel players
Kazakhstani ice hockey left wingers
Russian ice hockey left wingers
HC Shakhtyor Soligorsk players
HC Sibir Novosibirsk players
Zauralie Kurgan players